The 2010 Sata Rally Azores, officially 45º Sata Rallye Açores, was the seventh round of the 2010 Intercontinental Rally Challenge (IRC) season. The 19 stage gravel rally took place on the island of São Miguel in the Azores between 15–17 July 2010.

Introduction
The rally was based in the major city of Ponta Delgada.

Results
Bruno Magalhães became the sixth different winner of an IRC rally in 2010, after taking advantage of troubles for the Škodas of championship contenders Juho Hänninen and Jan Kopecký over the closing stages of the rally. Magalhães had dominated the early running of the event, holding a 2.2-second advantage into the final day. Hänninen eroded the gap on the first stage on Saturday, but would have to wait until stage fifteen to take the lead, as stage fourteen was cancelled after Andreas Mikkelsen hit a stray cow. Hänninen would hold the lead until the penultimate stage, when he picked up a right-front puncture on the Graminhais test, losing nearly two minutes to his chasers, falling to fourth behind Kopecký, Magalhães and Kris Meeke. Kopecký held a lead of 6.4 seconds going into the final  Tronqueira test over Magalhães. However, Kopecký's bid for a second win of the season would come to a premature end as he slid off the road with four kilometres remaining in the stage. His bad luck rewarded Magalhães with his first-ever win in the Intercontinental Rally Challenge, with Meeke coming home in second to record Peugeot's first 1-2 in the series since Meeke and Nicolas Vouilloz finished in those positions at the 2009 Rally International de Curitiba. Hänninen's third-place finish extended his championship lead over Kopecký to nine points, with Magalhães moving into third position.

Overall

Special stages

References

External links 
 The official website for the rally
 The official website of the Intercontinental Rally Challenge

Azores